Tirista is a genus of moths in the family Sesiidae.

Species
Tirista argentifrons Walker, [1865]
Tirista praxila Druce, 1896

References

Sesiidae